Cingulinini is a taxonomic tribe of very small sea snails, marine gastropod mollusks in the family Pyramidellidae, the pyrams and their allies.

Taxonomy 
Cingulininae was first introduced by Saurin in 1959, and according to Schander, Van Aartsen & Corgan (1999) it comprises seven genera; Cingulina, Cinctigua, Coemansia, Paracingulina, Polyspirella, Pseudocingulina and Puncticingulina.

As Cingulininae it has been one of eleven recognized subfamilies of the gastropod family Pyramidellidae (according to the taxonomy of Ponder & Lindberg, 1997), the pyrams and their allies. The other 10 subfamilies are Odostomiinae, Turbonillinae, Chrysallidinae, Cyclostremellinae, Sayellinae, Syrnolinae, Eulimellinae, Pyramidellinae, Odostomellinae and Tiberiinae.

In the taxonomy of Bouchet & Rocroi (2005), this subfamily Cingulininae has been downgraded to the rank of tribe Cingulinini and belonging to the subfamily Turbonillinae.

Genera
Genera within the subfamily Cingulininae include:
 Cingulina A. Adams, 1860 - type genus
 Cinctiuga Laseron, 1951 : synonym of Odostomia (Cinctiuga) Laseron, C.F., 1951 
 Coemansia  Briart & Cornet, 1873
 Paracingulina Nomura, 1936
 Polyspirella Carpenter in Gould, 1861
 Pseudocingulina Nomura, 1936
 Puncticingulina Nomura, 1936

Problematic genera
The following genera are difficult to place within the group Cingulininae + Eulimellinae + Turbonillinae:
 Atomiscala DeBoury, 1909
 Hamarilla Eames & Wilkins, 1957
 Kejdonia (Pseudographis) Mifsud, 1998
 Rissopsetia Dell, 1956

References

Pyramidellidae